Hans Zenker (10 August 1870 in Bielitz – 18 August 1932 in Göttingen) was a German admiral.

Biography
Born in Bielitz (now Bielsko-Biała, Poland), he entered the Imperial German Navy on 13 April 1889. As captain of the battlecruiser  in 1916–17, Zenker saw action in the Battle of Jutland on 31 May – 1 June 1916.

Zenker joined the Admiralty Staff in 1917. He was appointed to the North Sea area command in 1918, holding this post when the German war effort collapsed in November 1918.

After the war, he was an officer of the Reichsmarine, serving as Inspekteur der Marineartillerie from 1920 to 1923 and the top post of Chef der Marineleitung (Chief of the Naval Command) from October 1, 1924, to September 30, 1928. His tenure as head of the Reichsmarine saw the beginning of the rebuilding of the German fleet with the construction of light cruisers and torpedo boats and the planning of  ships, later built as the Deutschland, Admiral Scheer, and Admiral Graf Spee.

Family
The last years of his life Zenker spent in Osterode am Harz. His son, Karl-Adolf Zenker (1907-1998), held the office equivalent to Chef der Marineleitung—Inspector of the Navy—in the West German Bundesmarine from 1961 to 1967.

References 
 Bradley, Dermot; Hildebrand, Hans H.; Henriot, Ernest (1990). Deutschlands Admirale 1849–1945. Die militärischen Werdegänge der See-, Ingenieur-, Sanitäts-, Waffen- und Verwaltungsoffiziere im Admiralsrang. Band 3: P–Z. Osnabrück, Germany: Biblio Verlag. .

1870 births
1932 deaths
People from Austrian Silesia
People from Bielsko
Admirals of the Reichsmarine
Imperial German Navy personnel of World War I
Recipients of the Iron Cross (1914), 1st class